The Merkur Scorpio is a mid-size luxury car that was marketed by the Lincoln-Mercury division of Ford for the 1988 and 1989 model years through its Merkur sub-brand.  Slotted above the Merkur XR4Ti in the model line, the Scorpio served as the flagship of Merkur. A captive import from Ford of Europe, selected Lincoln-Mercury dealers marketed the Scorpio in the United States and Canada.

A near-direct counterpart of the Ford Scorpio Mk I (Ford Granada Mk III in the United Kingdom), the Merkur Scorpio was developed to give Lincoln-Mercury a competitor against European executive cars sold in North America, including the Audi 100, BMW 5-series, Mercedes-Benz 190E, Saab 9000, Sterling 827, and Volvo 740/760.

Following the 1989 model year, Ford ended imports of the Scorpio, closing down the Merkur brand. Lasting only for two model years, the Merkur Scorpio is among the shortest-lived Ford Motor Company nameplates in modern history. Along with unstable pricing due to fluctuating exchange rates and insufficient sales figures, the model line would have required a costly redesign to remain in compliance with upcoming American safety regulations.

The Scorpio was manufactured in Cologne, West Germany by Ford of Germany (Cologne Body & Assembly). In total, 22,010 examples were imported.

Model overview 
While offered as a five-door hatchback, the Merkur Scorpio was similar in appearance to the Mercury Sable. In comparison to the first-generation (1986-1991) Mercury Sable, the Scorpio was 4.5 inches shorter in length (2 inches shorter than the Ford Taurus), 1.3 inches narrower, and 2.7 inches longer in wheelbase; the two models were nearly identical in height.

Styled as a fastback, the Merkur Scorpio provided Lincoln-Mercury an opportunity to market a premium alternative to its traditional Lincoln Continental and Lincoln Town Car sedans with (far) better road manners.

Chassis specification 
The Merkur Scorpio shares its rear-wheel drive Ford DE-1 chassis with its Ford namesake, configured as a long-wheelbase version of the Ford Sierra (extended from 102.7 inches to 108.7 inches).

In contrast to American-designed rear-wheel drive Ford chassis (i.e. Fox, Panther), the DE-1 platform was fitted with four-wheel independent suspension.  In one of the first vehicles sold in North America, the Merkur Scorpio was equipped with standard anti-lock brakes (ABS) and four-wheel disc brakes. Within Ford Motor Company, the latter two features were previously exclusive to the Lincoln Mark VII.

In contrast to the XR4Ti, the Merkur Scorpio was fitted with a specific engine for North America.  The model line was fitted exclusively with a 144hp 2.9L V6 (the largest engine of the Ford Scorpio).  Shared with the Ford Ranger/Bronco II, the V6 was paired with a standard 5-speed manual transmission; a 4-speed overdrive automatic was offered as an option.

Body 
In contrast to many of its European counterparts, the Scorpio was offered solely as a five-door hatchback (a sedan was not introduced until 1990). As with the Mercury Sable sedan, the Scorpio was designed with blacked-out B and C-pillars for a "floating-roof" effect). Closer in style to the Ford Taurus, the front fascia was designed with a minimal front grille opening.

While less extensive than the redevelopment of the XR4Ti, several changes were made to distinguish the Merkur Scorpio from its Ford counterpart. The rear fascia is unique to Merkur, styled with a full-width taillamp lens (similar to the Mercury Sable). With the exception of divisional badging, the front fascia was largely unchanged; Merkurs are fitted with modified foglamps and headlamps (in compliance with American lighting regulations). Along with standard two-tone lower body trim, the Merkur Scorpio received its own model-specific alloy wheels.

Sharing much of its interior with the Ford Scorpio, the Merkur Scorpio was solely offered in a five-passenger configuration. In contrast to the Sable (or the Lincoln Continental or Town Car), the Scorpio was offered with power-reclining rear seats and a tilt-telescope steering column.

Pricing 
At its launch, the Merkur Scorpio was sold with a base price of $23,390. Options included automatic transmission, power moonroof and Touring Package. Most North American Scorpios were sold with automatic transmission and the Touring Package which raised the sticker price to $26,405. Although smaller in size, the Scorpio rivaled the Lincoln Town Car in price.

To attract customers to the model line, Lincoln-Mercury offered potential Scorpio customers a Guaranteed Resale Value Program, matching the resale value of the Scorpio to the Mercedes-Benz 190E.

Discontinuation 
On October 20, 1989, Ford announced it was ending imports of the Scorpio to the United States. As the XR4Ti had ended sales earlier in the year, the decision effectively closed Merkur; lasting only two model years longer than Edsel, it is among the shortest-lived American car brands in postwar history.

Coinciding with lower than anticipated sales (Ford had sought 15,000 sales a year for the brand), Merkur fell victim to unstable exchange rates between the dollar and German mark, leading to increases in price. As passive safety regulations were to be adopted in 1990, the Scorpio was required to adopt automatic seatbelts or airbag(s). The Ford Scorpio was developed with neither feature, and passive safety compliance proved too expensive to justify the conversion cost of redeveloping the slow-selling model line for North American sale.

Following the discontinuation of the Merkur Scorpio, Ford of Europe expanded the Granada/Scorpio model line, introducing a sedan body style at the end of 1989. The Scorpio Mk I was produced through the 1994 model year.

Sales

See also 
 Merkur
 Ford Scorpio (Europe)
 Ford Granada (Mk III in UK)

References

External links

 MerkurMidwest
 The Merkur Club of America
 Merkur encyclopedia.

Scorpio
Cars introduced in 1987
1980s cars
Coupés
Sedans
Executive cars
Hatchbacks
Rear-wheel-drive vehicles
Cars discontinued in 1989